Michael Morgan is an American politician from Vermont. He defeated Democratic Speaker Mitzi Johnson in the 2020 Vermont House of Representatives election.

Career 
In the November 3, 2020 general election, unofficial reported totals showed Mitzi Johnson losing her seat in the two-member Grand Isle-Chittenden district, with Republican incumbent Leland Morgan winning 2,768 votes, his nephew and fellow Republican Michael Morgan winning 2,619 votes, and Johnson trailing with 2,601. Johnson requested a recount, which affirmed Michael Morgan's victory by a 20 vote (2,627 - 2,601) margin.

References 

Living people
Republican Party members of the Vermont House of Representatives
Year of birth missing (living people)